The 2019 ARCA Menards Series was the 67th season of the ARCA Menards Series. Christian Eckes of Venturini Motorsports won the championship over teammate Michael Self. Eckes became the first champion since Tim Steele in 1997 to win the title after missing a race during the season.

On February 9, 2019, hours before the season-opening Lucas Oil 200, ARCA announced that the series would be renamed to the ARCA Menards Series for at least 2019 and 2020. Menards had previously been a presenting sponsor for ARCA.

Teams and drivers

Complete schedule

Limited schedule

Notes

Changes

Teams
 On Point Motorsports has announced plans to enter the series part-time in 2019.
 GMS Racing announced a re-entry into ARCA for 2019 with Sam Mayer as driver.
 KBR Development announced a full schedule for 2019 with technical support from GMS, up from a three-race venture in 2018 with a renumbered 28 car. To help the effort, KBR purchased some assets of MDM Motorsports.

Drivers
 On October 24, 2018, it was announced that Christian Eckes will run full-time for Venturini Motorsports in 2019. Eckes had run part-time with VMS in 2016, 2017 and 2018.
 On October 26, 2018, Corey Heim announced a schedule of thirteen events for the 2019 season in the No. 22 for Chad Bryant Racing.
 On November 2, 2018, it was announced that Chandler Smith would return to Venturini Motorsports for the 2019 season for 11 races. Smith will run mostly short track events due to age restrictions.
 On November 24, 2018, it was announced that Carson Hocevar and KBR Development will run the Sioux Chief Short Track Challenge in 2019.
 On November 30, 2018, it was announced that Natalie Decker will run a partial schedule with DGR-Crosley in 2019. She ran full-time for Venturini Motorsports in 2018.
 On December 6, 2018, Sam Mayer and GMS Racing announced a seven-race partnership.
 On January 10, 2019, it was announced that Harrison Burton will drive the Venturini Motorsports No. 20 Toyota for five races in 2019. Burton drove for MDM Motorsports in 2018.
 On January 11, 2019, Michael Self announced a full-season schedule with Venturini Motorsports in the organization's No. 25 entry. Self ran half the 2018 schedule with Venturini.
 Connor Okrzesik announced that he will make his ARCA debut in the race at Five Flags Speedway on March 9.
 On March 1, 2019, it was announced that Hailie Deegan signed a six-race deal to drive for Venturini Motorsports in the 2019 season.
 On March 22, 2019, Chad Bryant Racing announced that Ty Majeski would be in their No. 22 car for 5 races. Majeski ran a part-time season with Roush-Fenway Racing in the NASCAR Xfinity Series in 2018. Majeski would later add Talladega to his schedule.
 On March 26, 2019, Venturini Motorsports and Gavin Harlien confirmed a 3 race deal in the No. 55 entry.
 In April 2019, it was revealed that Tommy Vigh Jr. would run the full season with Fast Track Racing in the No. 10 car and run for Rookie of the Year after running a partial schedule with the team in 2018.

Crew chiefs
 On December 6, 2018, Joe Gibbs Racing announced that Mark McFarland had been hired as the crew chief of their ARCA team.
 On January 15, 2019, it was confirmed that  former Monster Energy NASCAR Cup Series crew chief Frank Kerr had signed with DGR-Crosley to become the crew chief for Natalie Decker in 2019.
 Matt Weber and Todd Myers both joined Chad Bryant Racing for 2019.
 On January 15, 2019, it was announced that Tony Furr, who served as crew chief of the StarCom Racing No. 00 team in the 2018 Monster Energy NASCAR Cup Series, moved to Mullins Racing in the same capacity.

Schedule

The full schedule was released on November 21st, 2018. The schedule remains largely unchanged from 2018. Although some tracks swapped dates throughout the season, the only track from 2018 to be excluded in 2019 was Berlin Raceway. In turn, the only track to be added to the schedule was Five Flags Speedway. For the first time in series history, every race was aired live. 12 races were broadcast on MAVTV, while 6 were covered by FS1 and the last 2 was covered by FS2.

Results and standings

Races

Drivers' championship
(key) Bold – Pole position awarded by time. Italics – Pole position set by final practice results or rainout. * – Most laps led.

See also
 2019 Monster Energy NASCAR Cup Series
 2019 NASCAR Xfinity Series
 2019 NASCAR Gander Outdoors Truck Series
 2019 NASCAR K&N Pro Series East
 2019 NASCAR K&N Pro Series West
 2019 NASCAR Whelen Modified Tour
 2019 NASCAR Pinty's Series
 2019 NASCAR PEAK Mexico Series
 2019 NASCAR Whelen Euro Series

References

External links

 Official website

ARCA Menards Series seasons
ARCA Menards Series